The Harvard Project on American Indian Economic Development, also known as the Harvard Project, was founded in 1987 at Harvard Kennedy School at Harvard University. It administers tribal awards programs as well as provides support for students and conducting research. The Harvard Project aims to understand and foster the conditions under which sustained, self-determined social and economic development is achieved among American Indian nations through applied research and service.

Overview of the Harvard Project 
Founded by Professors Stephen Cornell and Joseph P. Kalt at Harvard University in 1987, the Harvard Project on American Indian Economic Development (Harvard Project) is housed within the Malcolm Wiener Center for Social Policy at the Harvard Kennedy School, Harvard University. The Harvard Project aims to promote research to understand and foster the conditions under which sustained, self-determined social and economic development is achieved among the American Indian nations. The Harvard Project's core activities include research, education, and the administration of a tribal governance awards program. In all of its activities, the Harvard Project collaborates with the Native Nations Institute for Leadership, Management, and Policy at the University of Arizona. The Harvard Project is also formally affiliated with the Harvard University Native American Program.

At the heart of the Harvard Project is the systematic, comparative study of social and economic development on American Indian reservations. The study made several findings of what approaches lead to improved socio-economic conditions in American Indian nations. The study found that when Native nations make their own decisions about what development approaches to take, external decision-makers on matters as diverse as governmental form, natural resource management, economic development, health care, and social service provision. The study found that for development to take hold, assertions of sovereignty must be backed by capable institutions of governance. Nations do this as they adopt stable decision rules, establish fair and independent mechanisms for dispute resolution, and separate politics from day-to-day business and program management.

Indigenous societies are diverse; each nation must equip itself with a governing structure, economic system, policies, and procedures that fit its own contemporary culture. Nation-building requires leaders who introduce new knowledge and experiences, challenge assumptions, and propose change. Such leaders, whether elected, community, or spiritual, convince people that things can be different and inspire them to take action.

Honoring Nations 

The Harvard Project also administers Honoring Contributions in the Governance of American Indian Nations, a national awards program that identifies, documents, and shares outstanding examples of tribal government problem-solving. This expands the capacities of Native nation-builders by enabling them to learn from each other's successes. The high public visibility and news coverage of Honoring Nations also permit Non-native policymakers, the media, and the general public to see what Native nations are actually doing in the drive for self-determination. Established in 1998, Honoring Nations’ experiences are the foundation for the teaching, advising, and policy analysis from the partnership between the Harvard Project on American Indian Economic Development and the Native Nations Institute at the University of Arizona.

At the heart of Honoring Nations is the principle that tribes themselves hold the key to positive social, political, cultural, and economic prosperity—and that self-governance plays a crucial role in preserving and sustaining strong, healthy Indian nations. Its programs serve as sources of knowledge and inspiration and are utilized by more than just indigenous communities.

Honoring Nations invites applications from American Indian governments across a broad range of subject areas: education; health care; resource management; government policy development and reform; justice; intergovernmental relations; and economic, social, and cultural programs. A Board of Governors composed of distinguished individuals from the public, private, and nonprofit sectors guides the evaluation process, in which up to ten programs are selected for “High Honors” or “Honors.” All honorees receive national recognition. At each stage of the selection process, programs are evaluated on the basis of effectiveness, significance to sovereignty, cultural relevance, transferability, and sustainability. To facilitate the dissemination of best practices, honorees receive financial awards to share their success stories with other governments. The Harvard Project also produces reports, case studies, and other curricular materials that are disseminated to tribal leaders, public servants, the media, scholars, students, and others interested in promoting and fostering excellence in governance.

To date, Honoring Nations has recognized 142 exemplary tribal government programs, practices, and initiatives and held five tribal government symposia.

Honoring Nations Awards 

—1999 Honorees—

High Honors:

 Idaho Gray Wolf Recovery Program Wildlife Management Program, Nez Perce Tribe.
 New Law and Old Law Together Judicial Branch, Navajo Nation.
 Off-Reservation Indian Foster Care Human Services Division, Fond du Lac Lake Superior Band of Chippewa.
 Ojibwe Language Program Department of Education, Mille Lacs Band of Ojibwe.
 Pte Hca Ka, Inc. Cheyenne River Sioux Tribe.
 Tax Initiative Economic Development Kayenta Township Commission, Navajo Nation.
 Water Quality Standards Environment Department, Pueblo of Sandia.
 Wildlife and Fisheries Management Program Jicarilla Game and Fish Department, Jicarilla Apache Tribe.

Honors:

 Cherokee Tribal Sanitation Program Tribal Utilities, Eastern Band of Cherokee.
 Choctaw Health Center Mississippi Band of Choctaw Indians.
 Institutionalized Quality Improvement Program Puyallup Tribal Health Authority, Puyallup Tribe of Indians.
 Land Claims Distribution Trust Fund Chairman's Office, Grand Traverse Band of Ottawa and Chippewa Indians.
 Minnesota 1837 Ceded Territory Conservation Code Department of Natural Resources, Mille Lacs Band of Ojibwe.
 Navajo Studies Department Rough Rock Community School, Navajo Nation.
 Rosebud Sioux Tribal Education Department and Code Education Department, Rosebud Sioux Tribe.
 Tribal Court of the Grand Traverse Band Grand Traverse Band of Ottawa and Chippewa Indians.

—2000 Honorees—

High Honors:

 Economic Development Corporation: Ho-Chunk, Inc., Winnebago Tribe of Nebraska.
 Elders Cultural Advisory Council Forest Resources, San Carlos Apache Tribe.
 Hopi Jr./Sr. High: Two Plus Two Plus Two Hopi Junior/Senior High School, Hopi Nation.
 Navajo Treatment Center for Children and Family (Formerly: Navajo Child Special Advocacy Program) Division of Social Services, Navajo Nation.
 Poeh Center: Sustaining and Constructing Legacies Poeh Cultural Center, Pueblo of Pojoaque.
 Swinomish Cooperative Land Use Program Office of Planning and Community Development, Swinomish Indian Tribal Community.
 White Earth Suicide Intervention Team White Earth Chippewa Tribe.
 Yukaana Development Corporation Louden Tribal Council.

Honors:

 Coeur d’Alene Tribal Wellness Center Benewah Medical Center, Coeur d’Alene Tribe.
 Enhancing Government-to-Government Relationships Intergovernmental Affairs Department, The Confederated Tribes of Grand Ronde.
 Grand Traverse Band Planning and Development Grand Traverse Band of Ottawa and Chippewa Indians.
 Navajo Nation Archaeology Department – Training Programs Navajo Nation Archaeology Department, Navajo Nation.
 Pharmacy On-Line Billing Initiative Human Services Division, Fond du Lac Band of Lake Superior Chippewa.
 Small Business Development Program Corporate Commission, Mille Lacs Band of Ojibwe Indians.
 Treaty Rights/National Forest Management Memorandum of Understanding Member Tribes of the Great Lakes Indian Fish and Wildlife Commission.
 White Mountain Apache Wildlife and Recreation Program Wildlife and Outdoor Recreation Division, White Mountain Apache Tribe.

—2002 Honorees—

High Honors:

 Columbia River Inter-Tribal Fish Commission Yakama, Umatilla, Nez Perce, and Warm Springs Tribes.
 Gila River Youth Council Gila River Indian Community.
 Iroquois Nationals Lacrosse Haudenosaunee/Iroquois Confederacy.
 Umatilla Basin Salmon Recovery Project Confederated Tribes of the Umatilla Indian Reservation.
 Whirling Thunder Wellness Program Winnebago Tribal Health Department, Winnebago Tribe of Nebraska.
 Ya Ne Dah Ah School Education Department, Chickaloon Village Tribal Council.
 Yakama Nation Land Enterprise, Confederated Tribes, and Bands of the Yakama Nation
 Zuni Eagle Sanctuary - Zuni Fish and Wildlife Department, Pueblo of Zuni.

Honors:

 Bringing Financial and Business Expertise to Tribes - Borrego Springs Bank, Viejas Band of Kumeyaay Indians.
 Cherokee Nation History Course - Human Resources Department, Cherokee Nation.
 Coyote Valley Tribal EPA, Coyote Valley Band of Pomo Indians.
 Government Reform Diné Appropriate Government and Local Governance Projects - Office of Navajo Government Development, Navajo Nation.
 The Healing Lodge, Colville, Spokane, Kalispel, Kootenai, Coeur d’Alene, Nez Perce and Umatilla Tribes.
 “Nation Building” Among the Chilkoot Tlingit, Chilkoot Indian Association.
 Safe, Clean Waters - Lummi Tribal Sewer and Water District, Lummi Indian Nation.
 Southwest Oregon Research Project (SWORP), Coquille Indian Tribe.

—2003 Honorees—

High Honors:

 Chuka Chukmasi Home Loan Program - Division of Housing, Chickasaw Nation.
 Family Violence and Victim's Services - Department of Family and Community Services, Mississippi Band of Choctaw Indians.
 Honoring Our Ancestors: The Chippewa Flowage Joint Agency Management Plan, Lac Courte Oreilles Band of Lake Superior Chippewa Indians.
 Kake Circle Peacemaking, The Organized Village of Kake.
 Menominee Community Center of Chicago, Menominee Indian Tribe of Wisconsin.
 Navajo Nation Corrections Project, Department of Behavioral Services, Navajo Nation.
 Quil Ceda Village, The Tulalip Tribes
 Trust Resource Management - Office of Support Services, Confederated Salish and Kootenai Tribes.

Honors:

 Assuring Self-Determination through an Effective Law Enforcement Program - Gila River Police Department, Gila River Indian Community.
 Cherokee National Youth Choir, Cherokee Nation
 Choctaw Community Injury Prevention Program - Choctaw Health Center, Mississippi Band of Choctaw Indians.
 Cultural Resources Protection Program, Confederated Tribes of the Umatilla Indian Reservation.
 Gila River Telecommunications, Inc., Gila River Indian Community.
 Na’Nizhoozhi Center, Inc., The Navajo Nation in cooperation with Zuni Pueblo, City of Gallup, McKinley County, and the State of New Mexico.
 Northwest Intertribal Court System, Confederated Tribes of the Chehalis Reservation.
 Northwest Portland Area Indian Health Board The 43 federally recognized tribes of Oregon, Washington, and Idaho.

—2005 Honorees—

High Honors:

 Akwesasne Freedom School, Akwesasne Mohawk Nation.
 Flandreau Police Department, Flandreau Santee Sioux Tribe.
 Oneida Nation Farms, Oneida Nation of Wisconsin.
 Professional Empowerment Program SWO – Human Services Agency, Sisseton-Wahpeton Oyate.
 Siyeh Corporation, Blackfeet Nation.
 Tribal Monitors Program Tribal Historic Preservation Office, Standing Rock Sioux Tribe.
 Yukon River Inter-Tribal Watershed Council Koyukon and Gwich’in Athabascan, Yupik, and Tlingit.

Honors:

 The Cherokee Language Revitalization Project Cherokee Nation Language Department, Cherokee Nation.
 Choctaw Tribal Court System Mississippi Band of Choctaw Indians.
 The Hopi Land Team Office of the chairman, The Hopi Tribe.
 Miccosukee Tribe Section 404 Permitting Program Real Estate Services, Miccosukee Tribe of Indians of Florida.
 Migizi Business Camp Education Department, Little River Band of Ottawa Indians.
 Navajo Nation Sales Tax - Office of the Navajo Tax Commission, Navajo Nation.
 ONABEN's Innovative Models for Enterprise Development, ONABEN - A Native American Business Network.

—2006 Honorees—

High Honors:

 AlterNative Sentencing Program, Tulalip Tribal Court, the Tulalip Tribes.
 Citizen Potawatomi Community Development Corporation, Citizen Potawatomi Nation.
 Hopi Education Endowment Fund, The Hopi Tribe.
 Morongo Tutoring Program - Social Services Department, Morongo Band of Mission Indians.
 Navajo Methamphetamine Task Forces, Navajo Department of Behavioral Services, Navajo Nation.
 Red Lake Walleye Recovery Program, Red Lake Band of Chippewa Indians.
 Tribal Land Title and Records Office, Saginaw Chippewa Indian Tribe of Michigan.

Honors:

 Bad River Recycling/Solid Waste Department, Bad River Band of Lake Superior Band of Chippewa.
 Cultural Education and Revitalization Program, Makah Cultural and Research Center, Makah Nation.
 Homeownership: Financial, Credit and Consumer Protection Program - Umatilla Reservation Housing Authority, Confederated Tribes of the Umatilla Indian Reservation.
 Hopi Child Care Program, The Hopi Tribe.
 Indian Child Welfare Services - Department of Indian Child Welfare Services, Houlton Band of Maliseet Indians.
 Task Force on Violence Against Women, National Coalition of Native Nations and Organizations Affiliated Through the National Congress of American Indians.
 Winnebago Community Development Fund Ho-Chunk Community Development Corporation, Winnebago Tribe of Nebraska.

—2008 Honorees—

High Honors:

 Archie Hendricks, Sr. Skilled Nursing Facility and Tohono O’odham Hospice, Tohono O’odham Nation.
 Muscogee Creek Nation Reintegration Program, Muscogee Creek Nation.
 Osage Nation Governmental Reform Initiative, Osage Nation.
 Pine Hill Health Center, Navajo Nation, Ramah Chapter.
 Project Falvmmichi, Choctaw Nation.

Honors:

 Chickasaw Press, Chickasaw Nation
 Community Council Task Force, Ak-Chin Indian Community.
 Intercultural Leadership Initiative, Lac du Flambeau Band of Lake Superior Chippewa Indians.
 Tsigo bugeh Village, Ohkay Owengeh.
 Ziibiwing Center of Anishinabe Culture and Lifeways, Saginaw Chippewa Indian Tribe of Michigan.

—2010 Honorees—

High Honors:

 Air Quality Program, Gila River Indian Community.
 Citizen Potawatomi Nation Constitutional Reform, Citizen Potawatomi Nation.
 Coast Salish Gathering, Swinomish Indian Tribal Community.
 Leadership Institute at the Santa Fe Indian School, Santa Fe Indian School, AIPC.
 Network Relocation Effort, Native Village of Newtok.

Honors:

 California Fee-to-Trust Consortium, Elk Valley Rancheria.
 CTUIR Public Transit, Confederated Tribes of the Umatilla Indian Reservation.
 Joint Tribal-State Jurisdiction, Leech Lake Band of Ojibwe.
 Oneida Advocacy Through Investment Holdings, Oneida Nation of Wisconsin.
 Project Pueblo: Economic Development Revitalization Project, Ysleta del Sur Pueblo.

—2014 Honorees—

High Honors:

 Potawatomi Leadership Program, Citizen Potawatomi Nation.
 Owe’neh Bupingeh Rehabilitation Project, Ohkay Owingeh Pueblo.
 Port Gamble S’Klallam Tribal Child Welfare Program, Port Gamble S’Klallam Tribe.
 Honors: Lummi Nation Wetland and Habitat Mitigation Bank, Lummi Nation.
 Scott County Association for Leadership and Efficiency (SCALE), Shakopee Mdewakanton Sioux Community.
 Swinomish Climate Change Initiative, Swinomish Indian Tribal Community.

—2015 Honorees—

 Academic Readiness Effort, Santa Ynez Band of Chumash Indians.
 Ho-Chunk Village, Winnebago Tribe of Nebraska.
 Kenai CASA and Kenaitze Tribal Court, Kenaitze Indian Tribe.
 Nez Perce Tribe Fisheries Department, Nez Perce Tribe.
 Ohero:kon “Under the Husk” Rites of Passage, Haudenosaunee Confederacy.
 School-Based Health Centers, Fort Peck Assiniboine, and Sioux Tribes.

—2016 Honorees—

 Alaska Rural Utility Collaborative Alaska Native Tribal Health Consortium.
 Calricaraq: Indigenous Yup’ik Wellbeing Yukon Kuskokwim Delta Tribal Communities.
 Čáw Pawá Láakni – They have Not Forgotten Confederated Tribes of the Umatilla Indian Reservation.
 Chickasaw Nation Sick Child Care Program Chickasaw Nation.
 Native American Drug & Gang Initiative Task Force Intertribal Nations of Wisconsin.
 Project Tiwahu – Redefining Tigua Citizenship Ysleta del Sur Pueblo.

—2021 Honorees—

 Agua Caliente People Curriculum, Agua Caliente Band of Cahuilla Indians
 Cherokee Nation ONE FIRE, Cherokee Nation
 Energy Lifeline Sector Resilience: Low-carbon Microgrids, Blue Lake Rancheria
 Pe’ Sla, Great Sioux Nation
 Sitka Tribe of Alaska Environmental Lab, Sitka Tribe of Alaska
 Swinomish Tax Authority, Swinomish Indian Tribal Community

Other best practice awards programs 
Honoring Nations is also a member of a worldwide family of "governmental best practices" programs in Brazil, Chile, China, East Africa (Kenya, Tanzania, and Uganda), Mexico, the Philippines, Peru, South Africa, and the United States.

References

External links
 Official Harvard Project Website
 Native Nations Institute Website
 HUNAP Website
 Yes Magazine Article
 Public News Service: Northwest Tribes Honored for Good Government/

Harvard Kennedy School
1987 establishments in Massachusetts
Native American topics